Rudhran is an upcoming Indian Tamil-language action-thriller film produced and directed by S. Kathiresan, under his banner, Five Star Creations LLP. It marks his directorial debut. The film stars Raghava Lawrence, R. Sarathkumar and Priya Bhavani Shankar. The background score of the film was composed by Sam C. S., and the music was by G. V. Prakash Kumar and Dharan Kumar. The film is edited by Anthony. The film is scheduled to release on 14 April 2023.

Cast

Production 
This film is a second collaboration between Raghava Lawrence and R. Sarathkumar after their first venture, Kanchana. This film is the directorial debut for the producer S. Kathiresan. The first look poster for the film was released on 23 June 2022. A promotional glimpse of the film was released on 29 October 2022. Shooting of the film was wrap-up on 5 March 2022.

Music 
The songs of the film were composed by G. V. Prakash Kumar, while the remix version of the song "Paadatha Pattellam" from Veera Thirumagan was recreated by Dharan Kumar. Sam C. S. composed the background score for the film.

Release 
The film was earlier scheduled to release on 23 December 2022, but was postponed due to a delay in the VFX works. The film is scheduled to release on 14 April 2023.

References

External links 

2023 films
2023 directorial debut films
2020s Tamil-language films